Events from the year 1505 in art.

Events
 Pope Julius II summons Michelangelo to Rome to design the pope's tomb. The contract is revised five times and only three of forty large figures are ever executed.

Works

Many dates approximate
 Giovanni Bellini
Madonna del Prato
San Zaccaria Altarpiece
 Hieronymus Bosch
The Hermit Saint (triptych)
St. Jerome at Prayer
 Vittore Carpaccio
 Holy Family and donors
 Preparation of Christ's Tomb
 Piero di Cosimo
 The Finding of Vulcan on Lemnos
 The Adoration of the Christ Child
 The Forest Fire
 Albrecht Dürer - Portrait of a Young Venetian Woman
 Giorgione - The Three Philosophers
 Leonardo da Vinci – The Battle of Anghiari (lost painting)
 Lorenzo Lotto
Allegory of Virtue and Vice
Portrait of Bishop Bernardo de' Rossi
 Andrea Previtali – Scenes from Tebaldeo's Eclogues
 Raphael
Christ Blessing
Madonna and Child Enthroned with Saints
Madonna del Granduca
St. Michael
Small Cowper Madonna
Three Graces
Young Man with an Apple
 Tilman Riemenschneider - Holy Blood altarpiece, St. James's Church, Rothenburg ob der Tauber (woodcarving, completed)
Portrait of Henry VII of England

Births
date unknown 
Pomponio Amalteo, Italian painter of the Venetian school (died 1588)
Lambert Lombard, Flemish Renaissance painter, architect and theorist for the Prince-Bishopric of Liège (died 1566)
Jakob Seisenegger,  Austrian portrait painter used by Charles V (died 1567)
probable
Cornelis Anthonisz., Dutch painter, engraver and mapmaker (died 1553)
Pierre Bontemps, French sculptor (died 1568)
Matthys Cock, Flemish landscape painter (died 1548)
Juste de Juste, Franco-Italian sculptor and printmaker in etching (died 1559)
Jacques du Broeucq, Dutch sculptor and architect (died 1584)
Léonard Limousin, French painter, member of Limoges enamel painter family (died 1577)

Deaths
date unknown
Andrea Aleksi, Albanian architect, painter and sculptor (born 1425)
Matteo de Fedeli, Italian Renaissance painter (born 1450)
Filippo Mazzola, Italian Renaissance painter (born 1460)
Francesco Marmitta, Italian painter and jeweller (born 1460)
Ni Duan, Imperial Chinese painter of people and landscapes (born 1436)
Sebastiano Schiavone da Rovigno, Venetian woodcarver and marquetry artist ("Zoppo") (born 1420)
probable - Bartolomeo Caporali, Italian painter (born 1420)

References

 
Years of the 16th century in art
1500s in art